Alien Base is a 1981 role-playing game adventure for Space Opera published by Fantasy Games Unlimited.

Contents
Alien Base is an adventure involving a search by the player characters for the missing survey ship Timothy, which takes them to the barely surveyed planet Thonne, where they learn that the natives have been invaded by alien Slavers who now seem to have sinister plans for the human race.

Reception
William A. Barton reviewed Alien Base in The Space Gamer No. 48. Barton commented that "Alien Base [is] a relatively complete and satisfying adventure for SO, either as a stand-alone scenario or as the first in a planned series. If you enjoy Space Opera, I recommend Alien Base."

References

Role-playing game supplements introduced in 1981
Space Opera adventures